Sui Dongliang (born September 24, 1977 in Dalian, Liaoning) is a Chinese former professional footballer. He played for Bayi Football Team and Beijing Guoan during his career.

Club career

Bayi Football Team
As with all the most promising young Chinese players Sui Dongliang would quickly be included in the short-lived Chinese national youth team program to study football abroad in Brazil for a five-year training programme sponsored by Jianlibao and called the Chinese Jianlibao Youth Football Team. After graduating through the Jianlibao Youth Team he would move to Bayi Football Team (then called August 1) where he would go on to start his professional football career. With the team he would eventually establish himself as a regular member of the squad and stayed with the team until they disbanded in 2003.

Beijing Guoan
At the beginning of the 2004 league season he would join reigning Chinese FA Cup holders Beijing Guoan where he immediately became a regular within the team. He continued to play a vital part within the team until Huang Bowen would start to rise to prominence and replace him during the 2007 league season. By the 2009 league season Sui Dongliang would see his playing time significantly reduced and by the end of the 2009 league he decided to leave Beijing Guoan.

International career
As part of the promising young Chinese players that were studying abroad the Chinese Head coach Qi Wusheng would include  Sui Dongliang into his squad to make his debut in a friendly against USA on January 29, 1997 in a game that China won 2-1. He would go on to play for the Chinese U-20 that took part in the 1997 FIFA World Youth Championship and once the tournament finished he was one of several players that would graduate from the Chinese Jianlibao Youth Football Team to the senior team along with Li Jinyu, Li Tie and Zhang Xiaorui. Establishing himself as a regular within the team he would go on to score his first goal in a friendly against Malaysia on February 25, 1997 in a 2-0 win. When Bobby Houghton was introduced as the new Chinese Head coach Sui Dongliang would fall out of favour and while he was included in the squad that took part in the 1998 Asian Games once the tournament ended he would stop being included in any further squads during his career.

Management career
On 12 August 2022, Sui was appointed as caretaker manager of Beijing Guoan after Xie Feng had resigned.

References

External links

Sui Dongliang at Sina.com.cn

1977 births
Living people
Association football midfielders
Chinese footballers
Footballers from Dalian
Bayi Football Team players
Beijing Guoan F.C. players
Chinese Super League players
Beijing Guoan F.C. managers
Asian Games medalists in football
Footballers at the 1998 Asian Games
Asian Games bronze medalists for China
Medalists at the 1998 Asian Games
China international footballers